β-Selinene cyclase (EC 4.2.3.66) is an enzyme with systematic name (2E,6E)-farnesyl-diphosphate diphosphate-lyase (β-selinene-forming). This enzyme catalyses the following chemical reaction

 (2E,6E)-farnesyl diphosphate  β-selinene + diphosphate

Initial cyclization gives (+)-germacrene A in an enzyme-bound form.

References

External links 
 

EC 4.2.3